Martin P. Russo (born on January 19, 1968) is an American trial lawyer of Sicilian and Cuban heritage from New York. He handles complex business litigation in state and federal courts throughout the United States, and other matters pending in administrative and alternative dispute resolution forums. He has handled bet-the-company litigations, complicated commercial disputes, financial services litigation, regulatory defense, white collar defense, corporate compliance and internal investigations for publicly held and private companies in the United States and abroad.

Education
Russo attended the Regis High School.  He earned his J.D. degree, cum laude, from Harvard Law School and received a BA, magna cum laude, in the field of economics from Yale University.

Early Experience

Litigation

Commercial
Russo represents individuals and entities in multi-jurisdictional commercial litigation.  In recent years he has represented the interests of translation services CEO Philip Shawe, supermodel Irina Shayk, baritone Daniil Alekseenko, Hollywood producer and talent manager Stella Bulochnikov and the family of Georgian-born businessman Arkady “Badri” Patarkatsishvili.

SEC Regulation
He is experienced in counseling clients on arbitrations, disciplinary actions, and investigations and enforcement proceedings initiated by the U.S. Securities and Exchange Commission and Department of Justice, as well as self-regulatory organizations. He has worked on many FINRA disciplinary hearings and securing exceptional settlements. He also has significant experience representing clients in high-stakes criminal matters and has obtained numerous favorable outcomes. He has been an advocate on arbitrations and disciplinary proceedings.

Securities and FINRA related Work
After Black Monday, the NASDAQ introduced a system known as the Small Order Execution System (SOES), which forced market makers—firms that continually buy and sell stocks at listed prices—to execute electronically placed orders of up to 1000 shares at whatever price was posted. Datek trader Sheldon Maschler and Datek Online founder Jeffrey A. Citron engineered a computer program to spot market spreads that offered customers an arbitrage opportunity when market maker spreads were slow to adjust. With that tool Datek traders with customer orders were able to get a guaranteed execution on up to 1000 shares by pressing a button. Datek's people figured out a way to do that thousands of times a day, taking advantage of the posted listings that had not been updated. The firm and the traders were ultimately stopped and fined. Russo was hired from school to represent Sheldon Maschler, the 'Bad Boy' of Wall Street, and another of Datek traders in a disciplinary case surrounding this matter and later became the lead counsel for Datek and all of the traders who were charged with wrongdoing. After 27 hearing days (stretched to over more than a year of litigation), Russo's defense forced a settlement which permitted Datek to continue in the SOES business.  Under the terms of the settlement, Citron and Maschler acknowledged no wrongdoing paid a minimal fine and took limited suspensions.

Russo next represented Wall Street short seller John Fiero when the National Association of Securities Dealers threatened to bar him from the securities industry.  That representation continued for years and ultimately culminated in the landmark Second Circuit opinion Fiero v. NASD, in which the court held that FINRA as a quasi-governmental organization could not utilize the courts collect fines it assesses against its members thereby limiting the self-regulatory body's remedies to expulsion.

Russo represented Key West Securities founder and short seller Amr Ibrahim Elgindy in connection with two NASD disciplinary proceedings. Russo's work helped Elgindy prevail in both disciplinary matters – a feat that has not yet been repeated by any single respondent.  Following the appeals, the SEC issued a precedent-setting ruling which permanently established that the introduction of properly obtained accurate information into the marketplace is not a manipulation even if intended to affect the price of a security for profit.

In 2001, Russo represented broker-dealer D.L. Cromwell Investments, Inc. and its principals in a lawsuit against NASD Regulation Inc. seeking to enjoin the regulatory body from compelling the individual plaintiffs to testify in an investigation under the threat of expulsion for asserting their U.S. Fifth Amendment privileges against self-incrimination in response to questions because the regulator was working directly with the federal government.  The case alleged that a federal Grand Jury subpoena which directed responsive materials to be produced to Criminal Prosecution Assistance Group of the NASD made the entity a state actor on behalf of federal prosecutors.  Judge Lewis Kaplan initially dismissed the case, but later sat a motion to renew and reargue based on newly discovered evidence (an NASD informant's sworn statement) for more than a year until the principals were indicted by the federal government so that he could deny the motion as moot. The principals ultimately pled guilty to federal crimes and with Russo's representation were given sentences of probation with restitution.  As a result of the DL Cromwell case, the U.S. Department of Justice was forced to alter the way it interacted with the quasi-governmental NASD Regulation, now the Financial Industry Regulatory Authority (FINRA).

in 2011, Russo worked with entrepreneur Daniel Staton to recover $8.1M from Merrill Lynch in $1 billion FINRA REIT Arbitration stemming from an alleged illegal seizure and theft of 1,260,000 shares of Duke Realty Corporation common stock from Staton's accounts.

Commercial Cases

TransPerfect
Russo represented Philip Shawe in litigation before the Delaware Chancery Court after that court had ordered the sale of a deadlocked private company in which Shawe held a 49% equity stake.  With Russo serving as the lead, Russo PLLC and a team of co-counsel from other law firms navigated a challenge made by Shawe's former business partner Elizabeth Elting and secured approval of the sale of TransPerfect Global, Inc. to Mr. Shawe.  Chancellor Andre Bouchard found that “the undercurrent of [Ms. Elting’s] opposition to approval of the sale which she requested, reflects an apparent, deep-seated frustration with the fact that the winner of the auction was Shawe—who Elting has battled for years and who seems to engage in litigation as a way of life." By Order dated May 3, 2018, written by Chief Justice Strine, the Supreme Court of Delaware affirmed the judgment of the Chancery Court.

Little Rest Twelve and Fisher Island Investments
Russo, represented Inna Gudavadze, the widow of Georgian billionaire and philanthropist Badri Patarkatsishvili. Gudavadze was named in a wrongful death lawsuit, which alleged that she conspired with former Russian "oligarch" Boris Berezovsky to kill Mr. Patarkatsishvili to seize his fortune.  Russo successfully defended the action and obtained a dismissal with prejudice.

Following Patarkatsishvili's death, several of his business associates made fraudulent attempts to claim his business assets from family. A man named Joseph Kay, the stepson of Patarkatsishvili's aunt and someone who had worked with him, along with the American lawyer, Emanuel Zeltser, attempted to take control of Gudavadze's assets, including a restaurant in Manhattan named Ajna Bar and a large development on Fisher Island in Florida.

On March 31, 2010, Russo, with Jean-Yves Haouzi, a Buddha Bar executive and part owner of Little Rest Twelve, and a security team, walked into Ajna Bar (formerly Buddha Bar NYC) and locked out Joseph Kay, his sister Nina and his son David. The NYPD was called to the scene and ordered Nina and her managers off the premises.  By presenting corporate documentation, and having filed a lawsuit the same morning, Russo convinced the police to eject all of the Kay parties.  Gudavadze's family then took control of the restaurant.  In the court battle that followed, there was a legal question regarding whether Russo and his firm could replace Emanuel Zeltser as counsel to Little Rest Twelve. Because Russo was attempting to change the status quo, he had the burden to prove that his client owned LR12.  Russo met the court's burden.  He later also prevailed in his lawsuit against the Kays and the restaurant was awarded $3.7 million which the Kays had misappropriated after Badri's death.

A similar corporate battle ensued with respect to the development rights to Fisher Island. When Patarkatsishvili died, Kay attempted to fire his fellow officers in Fisher Island Holdings. Kay argued that he could not be forced out of power, and during a trip to Georgia, the locks were changed to the management offices and social club.  Russo, together with a team of bankruptcy and other lawyers in Florida, obtained a definitive ruling in federal court that the development rights belonged trusts that had been established by Badri for the benefit of Gudavdze and her family.

Russo and his team managed to obtain a $100,000+ court sanction of Emanuel Zeltser and, in another Gudavadze asset related case, a possibly career-ending NY Supreme Court judgment that the attorney had misappropriated millions of dollars of funds held in his attorney escrow account.

Personal
Russo was born and raised in New York. He plays soccer and supports soccer-related endeavors. He is the President of S.C. Eintracht; a club that plays in the Cosmopolitan Soccer League, and one of New York's oldest soccer clubs. Russo is also a USSF licensed coach who presently trains two adult men's amateur soccer teams.

References

Links

Lawfirm Website

Criminal defense lawyers
Harvard Law School alumni
Yale University alumni
Litigators
Corporate lawyers
Cosmopolitan Soccer League